Exponential Tilting (ET), Exponential Twisting, or Exponential Change of Measure (ECM) is a distribution shifting technique used in many parts of mathematics.

Exponential Tilting is used in Monte Carlo Estimation for rare-event simulation, and rejection and importance sampling in particular.
In mathematical finance  Exponential Tilting is also known as Esscher tilting (or the Esscher transform), and often combined with indirect Edgeworth approximation and is used in such contexts as insurance futures pricing.

The earliest formalization of Exponential Tilting is often attributed to Esscher with its use in importance sampling being attributed to David Siegmund.

Overview 
Given a random variable  with probability distribution , density , and moment generating function (MGF) , the exponentially tilted measure  is defined as follows:

where  is the cumulant generating function (CGF) defined as 

 

We call 

 

It satisfies .

The exponential tilting of a random vector  has an analogous definition:

where .

Example

One-dimensional examples include the normal distribution, the exponential distribution, the binomial distribution and the Poisson distribution. 

For example, in the case of the normal distribution,  the tilted density  is the  density. The table below provides more examples of tilted density.

In such examples, the random variable generation may not always be straightforward.

Advantages
In many cases, the tilted distribution belongs to the same parametric family as the original. This is particularly true when the original density belongs to the exponential family of distribution. This simplifies random variable generation during Monte-Carlo simulations. Exponential tilting may still be useful if this is not the case, though normalization must be possible and additional sampling algorithms may be needed.

In addition, there exists a simple relationship between the original and tilted CFG, 

 

We can see this by observing that 

 

Thus, 

.

Clearly, this relationship allows for easy calculation of the CGF of the tilted distribution and thus the distributions moments. Moreover, it results in a simple form of the likelihood ratio. Specifically, 

.

Properties 

 

In particular, the expectation of the tilted distribution is 

.

The variance of the tilted distribution is 

.

 Repeated tilting is additive.

 If , then  is the Kullback–Leibler divergence 

 

 Similarly, since , we have the Kullback-Leibler divergence as

.

Applications

Rare-event simulation
One common application is sampling from a distribution conditional on a sub-region of the domain, i.e. .

Saddlepoint approximation
The saddlepoint approximation method is a density approximation methodology often used for the distribution of sums and averages of independent, identically distributed random variables that employs Edgeworth series, but which generally performs better at extreme values. From the definition of the natural exponential family, it follows that 

. 

where  is the standard normal density of 

, 
, 

When considering values of  progressively farther from the center of the distribution,  and the  terms become unbounded.

This choice of  leads to the final representation of the approximation given by

Rejection sampling

 

where 

Importance sampling
Applying the exponentially tilted distribution as the importance distribution yields the equation 

, 

where 

is the likelihood function. Moreover, we have the variance given by

.

Example
Assume independent and identically distributed  such that . In order to estimate , we can employ importance sampling by taking 

. 

Then, 

, 

where  denotes the  defined by the saddle-point equation 

.

Stochastic processes
Thus, any Brownian motion with drift under  can be thought of as a Brownian motion without drift under . To observe this, consider the process . . The likelihood ratio term, is a martingale and commonly denoted . Thus, a Brownian motion with drift process (as well as many other continuous processes adapted to the Brownian filtration) is a -martingale.

Stochastic Differential Equations
The above leads to the alternate representation of the stochastic differential equation : , where  = . Girsanov's Formula states the likelihood ratio . Therefore, Girsanov's Formula can be used to implement importance sampling for certain SDEs.

Tilting can also be useful for simulating a process  via rejection sampling of the SDE . We may focus on the SDE since we know that  can be written . As previously stated, a Brownian motion with drift can be tilted to a Brownian motion without drift. Therefore, we choose . The likelihood ratio  
. This likelihood ratio will be denoted . To ensure this is a true likelihood ratio, it must be shown that . Assuming this condition holds, it can be shown that . So, rejection sampling prescribes that one samples from a standard Brownian motion and accept with probability .

Choice of tilting parameter

Siegmund's algorithm
Assume i.i.d. In order to estimate   where , when   is large and hence   small, the algorithm uses exponential tilting to derive the importance distribution. In this context, it is logical to ensure that . The criterion , where  is s.t.  achieves this. Siegmund's algorithm uses , if it exists, where  is defined in the following way: 
. 
It has been shown that  is the only tilting parameter producing bounded relative error.

Black-Box algorithms
We can only see the input and output of a black box, without knowing its structure. The algorithm is to use only minimal information on its structure. When we generate random numbers,  the output may not be 
within the same common parametric class, such as normal or exponential distributions. An automated way may be used to perform ECM. Let be i.i.d. r.v.’s with distribution ; for simplicity we assume . Define , where , . . . are independent (0, 1) uniforms. In other words, the rules of the game are that the algorithm may use

See also 
 Importance sampling
 Rejection sampling
 Monte Carlo method
 Exponential family
 Esscher transform

References

Sampling techniques